Sportvereniging Tot Ons Nut En Genoegen Opgericht or simply SV Tonego is a Dutch sports club from Luttelgeest. From 1980 to 1988, the basketball team was located in Haaksbergen as Hatrans Haaksbergen and played in the professional Dutch Basketball League.

History 
TONEGO was founded in 1954. It is a club with four departments: gym, tennis, volleyball and football. The first football team plays in the Third Class Saturday (2014/15).

Football 
The football division club has 300 members and has 7 senior teams (including 2 women), three junior teams, six pupils teams and two futsal teams. TONEGO plays on their own sports park.

Basketball 
From 1980 to 1988 TONEGO had a basketball section that was playing in Eredivisie under the sponsor names Hatrans Tonego Haaksbergen (1980–81), Hatrans Haaksbergen (1981–84 & 1986–88) and Permalens Haaksbergen (1984–86). In 1982–83 the team reached the playoff finals. Also the club participated three consecutive times (1983–84, 1984–85 & 1985–86) in FIBA Saporta Cup

Honours

Men's team
Eredivisie
Runners-up (1): 1982–83

Women's team
Dames Eredivisie
Champions (3): 1992–93, 1993–94, 1994–95

References

External links 
 

Basketball teams established in 1980
Basketball teams in the Netherlands
Multi-sport clubs in the Netherlands